Asha's Awakening is the second studio album by American singer-songwriter Raveena, which was released through Warner Records on February 11, 2022. The album was preceded by the singles "Rush" and "Secret". Asha's Awakening is a concept album from the point of view of a Punjabi space princess called Asha.

Inspired by the history of South Asian music and influenced by 60s, 70s and early 2000s eras of South Asian musicians and Western musicians, Asha's Awakening is primarily an experimental pop album with Western R&B, soul and jazz music. The album goes around a character's journey called Asha who is a Punjabi space princess from ancient Punjab who learns that life is chaotic and it's full of ups and downs. Through this, the character learns to find peace as being a human. But in Aurora's perspective, the album explores her South Asian identity, her personal growth, the modern culture and her past relationships.

Background and release 
Indian-American singer-songwriter Raveena, who is known for the release of her debut EP, Shanti, in 2017. Her debut album, Lucid, which was distributed by Empire Distribution, was released in 2019 which was critically acclaimed. In 2022, she signed to the major record label, Warner Records, and she announced that she would release her second album, which was also her first major label debut, Asha's Awakening. Asha's Awakening was released on February 11, following two singles from the album, "Rush" and "Secret" (featuring Vince Staples).

Writing and recording 

Aurora, while in quarantine, described that out of boredom, she created the character after watching and getting inspired by sci-fi movies, Bollywood movies and Punjabi folklore. She wrote the entire story of the character at night. The character was illustrated in 2D by the illustrator Lili Tae.

Aurora wrote on her Instagram that "Asha is a Punjabi space princess from the 1600's who gets transported to a highly spiritually advanced distant planet named ‘Sanataan’, where she is trained by the Kamlesh aliens for 1000 years in spirituality and cosmic magic and eventually rules as a princess there".

Music and lyrics
Asha's Awakening is described as R&B, rock, pop, soul and experimental album. The album explores Aurora's South Asian identity, her personal growth, the modern culture and her past relationships. The album has used and featured a lot of Indian instruments such as the tabla, the electric sitar, the swarmandel, the flute, the Bansuri and the kanjira. Alice Coltrane, Asha Puthli, The Beatles, Miles Davis, M.I.A., Timbaland, Missy Elliot, Solange, Jai Paul, Nelly Furtado and Sade are the main influences on the album. In some songs like "Rush", "Secret", "Magic", "Kismet" and "Asha's Kiss", while singing in English, she included different languages with Hindi and Punjabi.

Promotion

Tour
To support her album Asha's Awakening, Aurora has embarked on the Asha's Awakening Tour, her second headlining concert tour after three years. On social media, Aurora announced Asha's Awakening national tour. The tour covers North America with 21 dates. It was commenced on April 15, 2022 in Indio, California. While at Indio, she performed at Coachella 2022, making her the first woman of Indian descent to perform at Coachella. The tour was concluded on May 28, 2022 in Los Angeles, California.

Critical reception 

Asha's Awakening received widespread acclaim from music critics. On Metacritic, which assigns a normalised score out of 100 to ratings from publications, the album received a weighted mean score of 81 based on 4 reviews, indicating "universal acclaim".

Clash rated the album eight out of ten and described it as "a sterling project from front to back. Part romance epic, part sci-fi R&B dreamcatcher, Raveena sounds better than ever  before. [...] The album is bold, eccentric and proudly rooted in classical South Asian traditions, whilst sounding fresh and accessible at the same time."

Pitchfork said that it is "a throat-clearing moment for the singer, drawing on both Western and South Asian inspirations and collaborations for a blend of dance-friendly R&B songs and soothing ballads, each of which stands on her distinctive, quiet strength." and rated it 7.5 out of ten.

The Guardian said that, "Mainstream pop music should clear some room for her: it would make things infinitely more interesting.", and rated it four stars.

NME said that, "If this is an awakening, consider our attention well and truly captive; clever, confident, and utterly comforting." and rated it four stars

Rolling Stone, Clash and NPR included Asha's Awakening as the "Best Albums of 2022 So Far".  The first single, "Rush", was named in the list as "The Best Songs of 2022 So Far" by Rolling Stone. The second single "Secret", was named in the list as "R&B/Hip-Hop Fresh Picks of the Week" by Billboard. On December 1, 2022, Asha's Awakening was included in Rolling Stone'''s "The 100 Best Albums of 2022" and ranked in 84.

Krool Toys created and released a video game in a Game Boy inspired by Asha's Awakening''. The video game features the penultimate track, "Let Your Breath Become a Flower (Guided Meditation)".

Track listing

References 

2022 albums
Raveena Aurora albums
Warner Records albums
Soul albums by American artists
Contemporary R&B albums by American artists
Pop albums by American artists
Jazz albums by American artists